Pilocrocis milvinalis is a moth in the family Crambidae. It was described by Charles Swinhoe in 1885. It is found in Pune, India.

References

Pilocrocis
Moths described in 1885
Moths of Asia